Prionotinae is a subfamily of demersal, marine ray-finned fishes, part of the family Triglidae. The fishes in this subfamily are called sea robins and are found in the Western Atlantic and Eastern Pacific Oceans, the other two Triglid subfamilies are called gurnards.

Taxonomy 
Prionotinae was first proposed as a subfamily in 1873 by the German naturalist Johann Jakob Kaup. It is classified within the family Triglidae, part of the suborder Platycephaloidei within the order Scorpaeniformes. Prionotinae is regarded as the basal grouping within the family Triglidae.

Etymology  
The name of the subfamily is derived from what was its only genus at the time of its delineation by Kaup, Prionotus. This name is a compound of prion, “saw”, and notus, “back”, as Lacépède saw three free dorsal spines when he was describing the type species P. evolans but these were probably the result of damage to the specimen. The common names, sea robin, comes from the orange ventral surface of the species in the genus Prionotus, and from large pectoral fins which resemble a bird's wings.

Genera 
Prionotinae contains the following 2 genera:

 Bellator Jordan & Evermann, 1896
 Prionotus Lacépède, 1801

Characteristics 
Prionotinae sea robins are separated from the other Triglid subfamilies by the lateral line not being forked on the caudal peduncle, having 26 vertebrae and the ligament, called Baudelot's ligament, has its origin on the skull.

Distribution and habitat
Prionnotinae sea robins are found off the coasts of the Americas in the eastern Pacific and Western Atlantic Oceans, There are individual records from China (Taiwan), Japan (Honshu), and Queensland (Australia). This species occurs in depths between 1 m and 210 m, most frequently between 10 m and 50 m deep. It is demersal in temperate waters but pelagic or semi-pelagic in tropical regions where it forms large schools close to the surface. They are demersal fish of sandy bottoms in shallow waters.

References 

Triglidae
Taxa named by Johann Jakob Kaup
Fish subfamilies